Cécile Hugonnard-Roche is a French pianist and piano assistant teacher at the Conservatoire de Paris and has taught at the École normale de musique de Paris.

As of 2016, Hugonnard-Roche teaches the piano at the Saint-Maur-des-Fossés conservatory.

Biography 
Hugonnard-Roche studied music at the Conservatoire de Paris where she was taught by Vlado Perlemuter, Jean Hubeau and Dominique Merlet. There she won four First Prizes: piano, chamber music, harmony and accompaniment.

Thanks to a postgraduate scholarship, she spent two years perfecting her skills with foreign masters, thus broadening and deepening her repertoire.

Second prize (first nominated) at the Geneva International Music Competition in 1976, she also won the Schumann Prize and the Alex de Vries Foundation Prize (Antwerp).

Since then, she has been invited to play regularly in numerous festivals and has performed as soloist and chamber music throughout Europe, Brazil, Southeast Asia and Japan.

For the label "Quantum" she has recorded a CD dedicated to Robert Schumann, a second to Prokofiev and a third of French two-piano music with André Cauvin.

For "Bayard Musique", she records in the series Les Grands Chefs-d'œuvre, Schumann's Fantasy pieces and Mozart's Piano Sonata No. 11.

References

External links 
 Cécile Hugonnard-Roche on Bayard Musique
 Cécile Hugonnard-Roche's discography on Discogs
 Cécile Hugonnard-Roche
 Cécile Hugonnard-Roche - Fantasy Pieces, Op. 12: I. Des Abends (YouTube)

21st-century French women classical pianists
20th-century French women classical pianists
Conservatoire de Paris alumni
Academic staff of the Conservatoire de Paris
Academic staff of the École Normale de Musique de Paris
Living people
Year of birth missing (living people)
Date of birth missing (living people)
Women music educators